Alexander Evans (September 13, 1818 – December 5, 1888) was a U.S. Representative from Maryland.

Early life
Alexander Evans was born on September 13, 1818 in Elkton, Maryland to Mary (née Oliver) and Amos Alexander Evans. Evans attended the public schools and the local academy at Elkton. He later studied law. He was admitted to the bar in 1845 and commenced practice in his native city.

Career
Evans was a civil engineer's assistant and was appointed the chief engineer of the Annapolis and Elk Ridge Railroad.

Evans was elected as a Whig to the Thirtieth, defeating Richard Carmichael. He then went on to serve in the Thirty-first, and Thirty-second Congresses; serving from March 4, 1847 – March 3, 1853.

Evans was elected to the Maryland House of Delegates in 1866 under a Democratic ticket. While a delegate, he was involved in arranging the 1867 Maryland Constitution.

He engaged in the practice of law until his death.

Personal life
Evans was married to Mary Manly. Together, they had one child, Alexander Evans Jr.

Evans was the nephew of Levi Hollingsworth Evans, a Maryland state senator and Cecil County judge. His brother was Colonel Andrew Wallace Evans.

Death
Evans died in Elkton, Maryland on December 5, 1888. He is interred in Elkton Presbyterian Cemetery.

References

1818 births
1888 deaths
People from Elkton, Maryland
Maryland lawyers
Whig Party members of the United States House of Representatives from Maryland
Democratic Party members of the Maryland House of Delegates
19th-century American politicians
19th-century American lawyers